Berscheid may refer to:

 Berscheid, a municipality in Germany
 Ellen S. Berscheid (born 1936), American social psychologist
 Jessica Berscheid (born 1997), Luxembourgish footballer